Ord or ORD may refer to:

Places
 Ord of Caithness, landform in north-east Scotland
 Ord, Nebraska, USA
 Ord, Northumberland, England
 Muir of Ord, village in Highland, Scotland
 Ord, Skye, a place near Tarskavaig
 Ord River, Western Australia
 Ord Irrigation Area Important Bird Area
 Ord River Floodplain, Ramsar Site
 Ord Victoria Plain
 Ord Township, Nebraska (disambiguation), name of two townships in Nebraska, USA
 East Ord, Northumberland, UK
 Fort Ord, California, USA
 O'Hare International Airport (IATA airport code "ORD"), an airport in Chicago, U.S.

Mathematics
 Ord, the category of preordered sets
 Ord, the proper class of all ordinal numbers
 ord(V), the order type of a well-ordered set V
 ordn(a), the multiplicative order of a modulo n

Businesses
 Ord Publishing, an imprint of the German group VDM Publishing devoted to the reproduction of Wikipedia content

Fiction
 A prefix for several planets in the Star Wars universe, such as Ord Mantell
 Ord (comics), a Marvel Comics character
 Ord (Dragon Tales), one of the characters in the children's television series Dragon Tales on PBS

Other
 Ord (surname)
 Object-relational database
 Odinic Rite Deutschland, renamed Verein für germanisches Heidentum in 2006, a neopagan organisation
 Office of Rare Diseases of the United States National Institutes of Health (NIH)
 Optical rotatory dispersion, a form of spectroscopy used to determine the optical isomerism and secondary structure of molecules